Barbara Paulus won in the final 7–6, 4–6, 6–1 against Alexandra Fusai.

Seeds
A champion seed is indicated in bold text while text in italics indicates the round in which that seed was eliminated.

  Sabine Hack (second round)
  Sandra Cecchini (first round)
  Katarzyna Nowak (first round)
  Beate Reinstadler (first round)
  Barbara Paulus (champion)
  Petra Begerow (first round)
 n/a
  Veronika Martinek (second round)

Draw

External links
 1995 Warsaw Cup by Heros Draw

Warsaw Open
1995 WTA Tour